Bogazi is a village in Cyprus, located 7 km northeast of Trikomo in the Karpaz Peninsula. It is under the de facto control of Northern Cyprus.

References 

Communities in Famagusta District
Populated places in İskele District